Fate is a Danish rock band originally formed in 1984. They released four albums between 1984 and 1990 before disbanding in 1993. However, after a one-off reunion at a German music festival in 2004, Fate was reformed and released a new album, V, in 2006. In 2010, the band released Best of Fate 25 Years on EMI and, in November 2011, the album Ghosts from the Past was released on AOR Heaven in EU and Rubicon in Japan.

History 
The band Fate formed when former Mercyful Fate guitarist Hank Shermann (René Krolmark), Maxim Reality singer Jeff "Lox" Limbo (Jens Meinert), bass / keyboard player Pete Steiner (Peter Steincke) and drummer Bob Lance (Bjarne Holm), met with producer Simon Hanhart. The band recorded Cruisin' for a Bruisin' in 1988, which featured the single "Lovers" (released as a single plus videoclip in 1988) and a new version of "Love on the Rox" from the band's debut.

Personnel

Current members 
 Pete Steiner (a.k.a. Peter Steincke) – bass, keyboards (1985–1993, 2004–present)
 Jens Berglid – drums (2008–present)
 Mikkel Henderson – keyboards (2008–present)
 Torben Enevoldsen – guitar (2011–present)

Former members 
 Hank Shermann – guitar (1985–1988)
 Jens Meiner (a.k.a. Jeff "Lox" Limbo) – lead vocals (1985–1989)
 Mr. Moth (a.k.a. Jacob Moth) – guitar (1988–1990)
 Flemming Rothaus – Drums (1988)
 Mattias "IA" Eklundh – guitar (1990–1992)
 Bob Lance (a.k.a. Bjarne Holm) – drums (1985–1993)
 Rasmus Duedahl – drums (2004)
 Nicklas Burman – keyboards (2004)
 Mikael Kvist – drums (2005–2008)
 Per Johansson (a.k.a. Per Henriksen) – lead vocals (1990–1993, 2004–2009)
 Søren Hoff – guitar (1992–1993, 2004–2011)
 Dagfinn Joensen – lead vocals (2009–2016)

Discography

Studio albums 
Fate (1985)
A Matter of Attitude (1986)
Cruisin' for a Bruisin' (1988)
Scratch 'n' Sniff (1990)
V (2006)
Ghosts from the Past (2011)
If Not for the Devil (2013)

Compilation albums 
Best of Fate 25 Years 1985–2010 (2010)
Back to the Past (Re-Recorded) (2022)

References

External links 
 Official Site

Capitol Records artists
Danish hard rock musical groups
Danish heavy metal musical groups
EMI Records artists
Musical groups established in 1984
Musical groups disestablished in 1993
Musical groups reestablished in 2004
1984 establishments in Denmark